Chico & Roberta was a music and dance duo founded in 1989 consisting of two Brazilian children, Washington "Chico" Oliveira, also known as Uoston and Voston, and Roberta de Brito. The duo's first appearance was in the 1989 video clip of "Lambada". In 1990 they released the album Frente a Frente (Face to Face) in Portuguese. The album is a certified gold. After initial success, the duo disbanded in 1993.

History
Washington "Chico" Oliveira, also known as Uoston and Voston, was born February 20, 1979, in Eunápolis; Roberta de Brito was born April 27, 1979, in Brasília.

The duo first appeared in the video clip of "Lambada" by the French-Brazilian group Kaoma in 1989. Both Kaoma and Chico & Roberta had the same producer, Jean-Claude Bonaventure, and the duo's songs were composed by Kaoma's lead singer Loalwa Braz, with contributions by Daniel Darras, Alan Pype, Bonaventure, M. Nogueira, and Roberta and Chico themselves.

At the end of 1990, Chico & Roberta had their first success with the album Frente a Frente (Face to Face), which was certified gold by the French certification group SNEP and contained their first two singles, "Frente a Frente" and "Esperança do Natal" (a Christmas song).

Chico & Roberta recorded their songs in Portuguese, and they performed on television programs in various countries, including Brazil, France, the UAR and Italy.

After their initial success, however, the children's musical career suddenly stopped. Chico became a priest of a Protestant church and currently lives in Espírito Santo with his wife and daughter, working in a mission in Vila Velha. Roberta is an actress and assistant director, known for Isi/Disi - Amor a lo bestia (2004).

Discography

Singles
 "Frente a Frente" (1990) - #5 in France
 "Esperança do Natal" (1991) - #3 in France
 "Dança Do La La La" (1991)
 "Festa no mar" (1992) - #18 in France

Album
 Frente a Frente (1990)

References

External links
 Chico and Roberta on kids'music
  Chico and Roberta, on Bide et Musique
  Site about Chico and Roberta
 
 Some photos
 Photos from www.lambada.cc
 Kaoma 20 Years Chico & Roberta (Youtube)

20th-century Brazilian dancers
Brazilian musical duos
Child musical groups
Latin music groups
Musical groups established in 1989
Musical groups disestablished in 1993